Folkert Meeuw (born 11 November 1946) is a German former swimmer who competed at the 1968 and 1972 Summer Olympics, and won a silver medal in the 4 × 200 m freestyle relay in 1972. Next year he won a bronze in the same event at the 1973 World Aquatics Championships. In 1970 and 1974 he won six European medals in various events, including three gold medals.

His wife, Jutta Weber, and son, Helge Meeuw, both competed for Germany in swimming and won medals at Summer Olympics and World and European championships.

References

1946 births
Living people
German male swimmers
German male freestyle swimmers
German male butterfly swimmers
Olympic swimmers of West Germany
Swimmers at the 1968 Summer Olympics
Swimmers at the 1972 Summer Olympics
Sportspeople from Wiesbaden
World Aquatics Championships medalists in swimming
European Aquatics Championships medalists in swimming
Medalists at the 1972 Summer Olympics
Olympic silver medalists for West Germany
Universiade medalists in swimming
Universiade silver medalists for West Germany
Medalists at the 1973 Summer Universiade
20th-century German people
21st-century German people